Ena Shibahara and Wesley Koolhof defeated Ulrikke Eikeri and Joran Vliegen in the final, 7–6(7–5), 6–2 to win the mixed doubles tennis title at the 2022 French Open.

According to The New York Times, Koolhof and Shibahara had never met before competing in this tournament.

Desirae Krawczyk and Joe Salisbury were the defending champions, but Salisbury chose not to defend his title. Krawczyk competed with Neal Skupski, but they lost in the quarterfinals to Eikeri and Vliegen.

Seeds

Draw

Finals

Top half

Bottom half

Other entry information

Wild cards

Alternates
  Asia Muhammad /  Lloyd Glasspool

Withdrawals
  Alizé Cornet /  Édouard Roger-Vasselin → replaced by  Asia Muhammad /  Lloyd Glasspool

References

External links
Main draw

Mixed doubles
French Open - Mixed doubles
French Open - Mixed doubles
French Open by year – Mixed doubles